Orthotylus verticatus is a species of bug from a family of Miridae that can be found in France and Spain.

References

Insects described in 1958
Hemiptera of Europe
verticatus